Pope Paul VI created 143 cardinals in six consistories. His predecessor Pope John XXIII had disregarded the centuries-long tradition that limited the College of Cardinals to seventy members, increasing its size to as high as 88 in 1961. Paul continued this practice, and with his appointments the College grew to 103 in 1965, 118 in 1967, 134 in 1969. He then instituted a new rule that diminished the significance of the size of the College. In November 1970 he announced that as of 1 January 1971 only a cardinal who had not yet reached his 80th birthday would be allowed to enter a conclave. When the 1973 consistory increased the size of the College to 145, the number of those under 80 who constituted the cardinal electors was 117. In 1975, he set the maximum number of cardinal electors at 120. Each of his later consistories in 1976 and 1977 brought the number of electors to the full complement of 120.

Three of those Paul named a cardinal became pope, Pope John Paul I, Pope John Paul II, and Pope Benedict XVI, who was the last survivor of the cardinals whom Paul named. Among the others he made cardinal were the first from Benin (Gantin), the Dominican Republic (Beras Rojas), Indonesia (Darmojuwono), Madagascar (Rakotomalala), Nigeria (Ekandem), Senegal (Thiandoum), Sri Lanka (Cooray), Switzerland (Journet), and Vietnam (Trịnh).

22 February 1965

When Paul VI added members to the College for the first time, he increased its numbers from 76 to 103, raising the number of Italians from 26 to 32. The 27 he named included the first cardinal from Sri Lanka and Switzerland, the second black African, and three Eastern Rite Patriarchs. He assigned the patriarchs to the College's highest rank, cardinal bishop, which was previously reserved to six cardinals assigned as bishops of sees near Rome. He said that the growth of the College did not suggest a lesser role for the world's bishops, but reflected the fact that "The proportions of the Church are no longer those of the 16th century". 

The ceremonies were reduced from four to two, though still scheduled to extend over four days. At the second, public ceremony, the pope and the new cardinals concelebrated Mass for the first time on such an occasion and Paul, after addressing them briefly in Latin, spoke in Italian "because it is easier for us" and then in French, English, German, and Spanish. The language of the rite was adapted slightly for the patriarchs, and the new cardinals did not demonstrate their obedience by prostrating themselves at the pope's feet. Before the consistory, the Vatican restricted the use of silk in cardinals' attire.

Pope Paul created 27 cardinals on 22 February: the three patriarchs joined the order of cardinal bishops, twenty became cardinal priests, and four cardinal deacons. The patriarchs' relationship to their sees remained unchanged. On 25 February he assigned the others their titles and deaconries, except for Herrera Oria, who received his red biretta from Spain's Francisco Franco on 1 March and then his titular church assignment from Pope Paul on 26 March.

26 June 1967
 
Pope Paul announced the names of 27 new cardinals on 29 May 1967, and the consistory that followed increased the College from 93 to 118 members, a new high. Twenty were European, including 12 Italians. He again simplified the cardinals' attire and reduced the number of their attendants, but reorganized the ceremonies into three events.

On 26 June Pope Paul created 23 cardinals of the order of cardinal priests and four cardinal deacons. Some 24 of the 27 assembled in the Pius XII auditorium and there received notes that Paul had named them in the closed ceremony. Pope Paul gave 24 of them their titular assignments and deaconries on 29 June. The other three, papal nuncios to Italy (Grano), Portugal (Fürstenberg), and Spain (Riberi), followed the custom of receiving their notices and their red birettas from the head of the government to which they were posted. Pope Paul gave them their birettas and titular churches on 15 July.

28 April 1969

On 29 March 1969, Pope Paul announced he would increase the size of the College to 134 at a consistory on 28 April. He named 33 new cardinals from 19 countries, the largest group of new cardinals ever created at a consistory until then (later surpassed when John Paul II created 44 cardinals in 2001), and withheld the names of two more. As part of three ceremonies, a new procedure required each to swear an oath of secrecy to "not divulge to their damage or discredit the councils entrusted to me, either directly or indirectly, without the consent of the Holy See". 

On 28 April 1969, Pope Paul created 24 cardinals of the order of cardinal priests and nine of the order of cardinal deacons. On 30 April he gave them their red birettas and assigned their titular churches and deaconries. Of the two cardinals he created in pectore, he revealed the name of Štěpán Trochta on 5 March 1973, and at the same time he announced that the other was Iuliu Hossu of Rumania, who died in 1970 without being recognized as a cardinal.

Cardinal in pectore

5 March 1973

On 2 February 1973, Pope Paul released the names of thirty new cardinals from 17 countries. The consistory on 5 March brought the number of cardinals to 145, with 117 young enough to serve as cardinal electors. The College had never been larger before, but the size of 145 would regularly be surpassed from 1985 on. The Vatican announced on 12 February that the ceremonies for creating cardinals would be simplied and shortened. Each cardinal's red hat would be delivered by messenger, not ceremoniously imposed by the pope.

At the consistory on 5 March, a one-day ceremony that replaced a series of ceremonies spread across five days, Pope Paul created 24 cardinals of the order of cardinal priests and six of the order of cardinal priests. He gave red birettas and titular church and deaconry assignments to the 29 who were present, all but Jubany Arnau whose health prevented him from attending. He revealed the names of two prelates he had made cardinals in pectore in 1969: Stepan Trochta of Czechoslovakia and Iuliu Hossu of Rumania, who died in 1970. He discussed plans to modify procedures for papal elections, as he later did by limiting the number of electors to 120. He mentioned other ideas he never implemented like adding as voters the patriarchs of the Eastern Rite churches even if not cardinals and allowing the leadership of the Synod of Bishops to participate as electors.

24 May 1976

On 27 April 1976, Pope Paul announced plan to create 19 cardinals on 24 May 1976. He said he was not announcing the names of two more he would make cardinals in pectore. In the event, Trin Nhu Khue, Archbishop of Hanoi, was able to attend the ceremony, leaving only one name secret. On 24 May Pope Paul created twenty cardinals, assigning titular churches to fourteen cardinal priests and deaconries to six cardinal deacons.

The appointments brought the number of cardinal electors to 120 and number of cardinals to 137. He had set the maximum number of electors at 120 in October 1975 in Romano Pontifici eligendo.

Cardinal in pectore

27 June 1977

On 2 June 1977, Pope Paul announced that he would create four new cardinals on 27 June. On 27 June Pope Paul created these four cardinals and announced the name of Tomášek, created in pectore a year earlier. Four of the five were assigned their titular churches and Gantin his deaconry. All were young enough to serve as papal electors. This brought the membership of the College of Cardinals to 137 and the number of cardinal electors up to the limit of 120. By one account, this "mini-consistory" was held principally for Benelli, who was being made Archbishop of Florence after ten years as Substitute at the Secretariat of State. Paul himself, at a similar stage of a similar career, had been appointed Archbishop of Milan in 1954 but not made a cardinal by Pius XII. This treatment of Benelli prompted speculation that Paul was designating him his successor or preparing to retire when he reached 80 later in the year.

Notes

References

External links 

Paul VI
20th-century Catholicism
College of Cardinals
Pope Paul VI